Hege may be a given name or a surname. Its given name version is the short form of Helga.

People with the given name
 Hege Bøkko (born 1991), Norwegian long-track speedskater
 Hege Brannsten (born 1972), Norwegian sprint canoeist
 Hege R. Eriksen (born 1965), Norwegian research director and professor
 Hege Frøseth (born 1969), Norwegian handball player
 Hege Gunnerød (born 1973), Norwegian footballer
 Hege Hansen (born 1990), Norwegian footballer
 Hege Jensen (born 1971), Norwegian politician
 Hege Kvitsand (born 1973), Norwegian handball player
 Hege Haukeland Liadal (born 1972), Norwegian politician
 Hege Løken (born 1993), Norwegian handball player
 Hege Nerland (1966–2007), Norwegian politician
 Hege Peikli (born 1957), Norwegian cross-country skier
 Hege Anett Pettersson (born 1973), Norwegian handball player
 Hege Reitan, Norwegian sport wrestler
 Hege Riise (born 1969), Norwegian footballer
 Hege Schøyen (born 1957), Norwegian singer, actor and comedian
 Hege Skjeie (1955–2018), Norwegian political scientist and feminist
 Hege Søfteland (born 1959), Norwegian politician
 Hege Lanes Steinlund (born 1969), Norwegian referee
 Hege Stendahl (born 1967), Norwegian cyclist
 Hege Storhaug (born 1962), Norwegian journalist, author and political activist
 Hege Tunaal (born 1948), Norwegian singer
 Hege Christin Vikebø (born 1978), Norwegian handball player
 Hege Bakken Wahlquist (born 1992), Norwegian handball player

People with the surname
 Daniel Hege, American orchestral conductor
 Gerald Hege (born 1948), American sheriff
 Louis Van Hege (1889–1975), Belgian footballer

References

Norwegian feminine given names